Just Spee (born 12 January 1965) is a Dutch football administrator.  Since 17 December 2019 he serves as President of the Royal Netherlands Football Association (KNVB).

Background and career 
Just Spee was born in Haarlem on 12 January 1965. After his Master Business/Managerial Econometrics at the Vrije Universiteit (Free University of Amsterdam), he started working in business. Spee has worked as a manager at companies such as Procter & Gamble, Philips, Rothmans and Alvarez & Marsal. In 2012 Spee became CEO of Endemol, the biggest independent TV producer in the world. Hereafter, Spee became CEO at Stage Entertainment. Just Spee is a member of the Supervisory Boards of various companies and civil society organizations such as the OLVG hospital (Amsterdam) and UNICEF Netherlands. Furthermore, he was a mentor for Future Female Leaders.

Career in football 
Just Spee played football at the Royal Haarlem Football Club (Koninklijke HFC). Later he became a member of the board of this football club. Spee had already come into contact with football during his career in business as a member of the Supervisory Board of the Eredivisie Media & Marketing CV. At the end of May 2019, Spee was elected as President of the KNVB. In December 2019 he officially took office as the successor of Michael van Praag. 

At the 44th UEFA conference, held in 2020 in Amsterdam, Spee announced that under his leadership, the KNVB would be playing an active and connecting role in the international world of football. Spee realized this ambition by being elected as a member of UEFA's Executive Committee. The Executive Committee is the highest executive organ of UEFA. This committee decides over the structure of the European footballing landscape in relation to competition formats, (financial) regulation, governance, elections, safety and licensing terms.

References 

Businesspeople from Haarlem
Presidents of the Royal Dutch Football Association
Members of the UEFA Executive Committee
Living people
1965 births
Vrije Universiteit Amsterdam alumni
Endemol